The  New Jersey lunar sample displays  are two commemorative plaques consisting of small fragments of Moon specimen brought back with the Apollo 11 and Apollo 17 lunar missions and given in the 1970s to the people of the state of New Jersey by United States President Richard Nixon.

Description

Apollo 11

Apollo 17

History 
The Apollo 11 "goodwill Moon rocks" commemorative podium plaque display is at the New Jersey State Museum. The whereabouts of the Apollo 17 display are unknown.

See also
 List of Apollo lunar sample displays

References

Further reading

External links

 Partial list of Apollo  11, 12, 14, 15, 16, and 17 sample locations, NASA Johnson Space Center

Stolen and missing moon rocks
Tourist attractions in New Jersey